Minzhe was a geographic and political area of the Qing dynasty in southeastern China. It included the modern-day areas of Fujian, Taiwan, and Zhejiang. The Governor of Minzhe was known as the viceroy of Minzhe in the English language. Its administrative centre was located in Fuzhou.

Former administrative divisions of China